The San Pitch Utes (Sahpeech, Sanpeech, Sanpits, San-pitch) were members of a band of Ute people that lived in the Sanpete Valley and Sevier River Valley and along the San Pitch River. They may have originally been Shoshonean, and were generally considered as part of the Timpanogos. 

Mormons settled in the Sanpete Valley in the winter of 1849–1850. They brought measles which decimated the San Pitch Utes. Mormons established the town of Manti and the Utes continued to camp, hunt, and fish near there. Those who had horses hunted traveled for hunting grounds. Generally, the band was having difficulty finding sufficient food and Chief Sanpitch and Walkara asked the Mormons to teach them how to farm. There were few band members who were interested in embracing agriculture. More than 100 Utes were baptized in Manti Creek by the Mormons, but many Utes made half-hearted conversions and the band continued their traditional ceremonies. The Utes asked settlers for food, which was upsetting to some of the Mormons. Brigham Young assigned Indian Agents for the Pahvant and Uintah tribe districts.

San Pitch Utes were classified as members of the Uintah tribe by the U.S. government when they were relocated to the Uintah and Ouray Indian Reservation.

Notable people
 Chief Aropeen 
 Chief Sanpitch, for whom Sanpete County, Utah is named.

References

Ute tribe